Karl Georg Külb (1901–1980) was a German screenwriter and film director.

Selected filmography
Screenwriter
 My Son the Minister (1937)
 The Blue Fox (1938)
 The Girl of Last Night (1938)
 Hello Janine! (1939)
 Der Stammbaum des Dr. Pistorius (1939)
 Women Are Better Diplomats (1941)
 With the Eyes of a Woman (1942)
 Love Letters (1944)
 Don't Play with Love (1949)
 Twelve Hearts for Charly (1949)
 Long Is the Road (1949)
 Sensation in Savoy (1950)
 Marriage for One Night (1953)
 Tante Jutta aus Kalkutta (1953)
 Sun Over the Adriatic (1954)
 Conny and Peter Make Music (1960)

Bibliography
 Shandley, Robert R. Rubble Films: German Cinema in the Shadow of the Third Reich. Temple University Press, 2001.

External links

1901 births
1980 deaths
Film people from Rhineland-Palatinate
Mass media people from Mainz
People from Rhenish Hesse